Qarwaqucha (Quechua qarwa leaf worm, larva of a beetle / pale / yellowish / golden, qucha lake, hispanicized spelling Carhuacocha) is a lake in Peru located in the Huanuco Region, Huamalíes Province, Llata District. It lies southwest of the lakes Yanaqucha and Saqraqucha, at the foot of the mountain Mishiwala (Mishihuala).

See also
List of lakes in Peru

References

Lakes of Peru
Lakes of Huánuco Region